The 1990 Torneo Godó was the 38th edition of the Torneo Godó annual men's tennis tournament played on clay courts in Barcelona, Spain and part of the Championship Series of the 1990 ATP Tour. It was the 38th edition of the tournament and took place from 9 April until 15 April 1990, and fourth-seeded Andrés Gómez won the singles title.

Finals

Singles
 Andrés Gómez defeated  Guillermo Pérez Roldán 6–0, 7–6, 3–6, 0–6, 6–2

Doubles
 Andrés Gómez /  Javier Sánchez defeated  Sergio Casal /  Emilio Sánchez 7–6, 7–5

References

External links
 Official tournament website
 ATP tournament profile

Torneo Godo
Barcelona Open (tennis)
Torneo Godó
Torneo Godó